Yeh Juei-feng (born 18 March 1938) is a Taiwanese weightlifter. He competed in the men's lightweight event at the 1964 Summer Olympics.

References

1938 births
Living people
Taiwanese male weightlifters
Olympic weightlifters of Taiwan
Weightlifters at the 1964 Summer Olympics
Place of birth missing (living people)